Holger Simon Paulli (22 February 181023 December 1891) was a Danish conductor and composer. Paulli composed an opera, thirteen ballets, an overture, and pieces for violin and lieder.

Biography
Paulli was born in Copenhagen, Denmark. He was a student of violinist and composer Claus Schall and of classical composer Frederik Thorkildsen Wexschall.  During 1839–41, he undertook a study trip abroad to Germany, Austria, Italy, France and England.  In 1849 he also became concertmaster. He  joined the Royal Danish Orchestra  and became its conductor in 1864, a position he filled for 20 years until the end of the 1882–1883 season.  At the same time, he also conducted the orchestra of the Cecilia Association  (Cæciliaforeningen).  With his performances of Lohengrin and Die Meistersinger von Nürnberg he contributed greatly to the spread of Richard Wagner's work in Denmark.

Paulli was also a member of the management of the Copenhagen Conservatory from 1866 and was chairman of the Chamber Music Association during 1868–91. He conducted the Royal Danish Orchestra in the world premiere of Edvard Grieg's Piano Concerto in A minor, in the Casino Concert Hall in Copenhagen on 3 April 1869.  The soloist was Norwegian pianist Edmund Neupert (1842–1888).

Personal life
In 1842, Paulli married Nielsine Albertha Schouw. Their daughter Augusta Paulli (1843-1922) was an artist.
Paulli died in Copenhagen and was buried in Assistens Cemetery.

References

External links
 

1810 births
1891 deaths
Musicians from Copenhagen
Danish classical composers
Danish male classical composers
Danish Romantic composers
Ballet composers
Danish conductors (music)
Male conductors (music)
Academic staff of the Royal Danish Academy of Music
19th-century classical composers
19th-century conductors (music)
19th-century Danish composers
Burials at Assistens Cemetery (Copenhagen)